Puget-sur-Argens (literally Puget on Argens) is a commune in the Var department in the Provence-Alpes-Côte d'Azur region in southeastern France.

It is located at 687 kilometres south-east of Paris. It is called Lo Pugeton or Lo Puget d'Argènç in Occitan and Le Petit Puget in the province to distinguish it from the city formerly more important from Puget-Ville. and is located at the crossing of the Route nationale 7 and the A8 autoroute. The population of Puget-on-Argens has multiplied by four since 1950 and many companies have come to the town. In fact, the strong demographic and economic expansion in direct periphery tends to transform the commune into a suburban residential and working area. Its inhabitants are called Pugétois.

Demographics

Climate

See also
Communes of the Var department

References

External links
 Puget sur Argens Tourist Office website

Communes of Var (department)